Christ the King College (CKC) is a private Catholic school for both boys and girls located in Gingoog, Misamis Oriental, Philippines. Established a Colegio Catolico in 1905, it was renamed Colegio-Seminario de Calbayog in 1910, few month after Calbayog was made into a diocese for Samar and Leyte. In 1924, it was renamed Colegio de San Vicente de paul (CSVP) and was transferred to Brgy. Rawis after its separation from the seminary. In 1952, two American Franciscan missionaries of the Assumption of the Blessed Virigim Mary (BVM) Province of Pulaski, Wisconsin, USA, arrived in Calbayog City. CSVP was transferred from Brgy. Rawis to its present location Magsaysay Boulevard. On October 30, 1955, CSVP was dedicated to Chris the King, hence, the present name Christ the King College.

References

External links
 

Catholic universities and colleges in the Philippines
Catholic elementary schools in the Philippines
Catholic secondary schools in the Philippines
Universities and colleges in Misamis Oriental
Educational institutions established in 1916
1916 establishments in the Philippines
Religious of the Virgin Mary